Fabiana Kuestner Gripa (born 17 April 1981) is a Brazilian handball player. She was born in Blumenau, Brazil. She competed at the 2004 Summer Olympics, where Brazil placed 7th.

References

External links
 

1981 births
Living people
People from Blumenau
Brazilian female handball players
Olympic handball players of Brazil
Handball players at the 2004 Summer Olympics
Sportspeople from Santa Catarina (state)
20th-century Brazilian women
21st-century Brazilian women